Ruth, also known as Ruth Station, was a loading station on the Milwaukee line of the Northern Pacific Railway that ran parallel to the Ocean Beach Highway between Chehalis and South Bend, Washington. Timber from nearby sawmills and logging communities would be shipped from Ruth to Pacific coast ports or to the Puget Sound region. The rail station no longer exists.

References

Northern Pacific Railway
Geography of Lewis County, Washington